Simcoe Centre  was a federal electoral district in Ontario, Canada, that was represented in the House of Commons of Canada from 1988 to 1997.  This riding was created in 1987 from parts of Grey—Simcoe, Simcoe South and Wellington—Dufferin—Simcoe ridings.

Simcoe Centre consisted of the City of Barrie, the towns of Alliston and Wasaga Beach, the Village of Cookstown and the townships of Essa, Innisfille, Sunnidale, Tosorontio and Vespra.

The electoral district was abolished in 1996 when it was redistributed into Barrie—Simcoe—Bradford and Simcoe—Grey ridings.

Simcoe Centre is the only riding east of Manitoba to have ever elected a Reform Party Member of Parliament, in the 1993 federal election, Ed Harper, who won a narrow victory over the Liberal candidate. Simcoe Centre was also the only one of Ontario's 98 seats to not go to the Liberals in the 1993 federal election.

Members of Parliament

This riding has elected the following Members of Parliament:

Election results

See also 
 List of Canadian federal electoral districts
 Past Canadian electoral districts

External links 
 Website of the Parliament of Canada

Former federal electoral districts of Ontario